Leo Hilokoski (born 1941 Helsinki) is a Finnish bowler. Hilokoski was the world champion in team bowling in 1975 and European champion in 1973. He won the personal Finnish Championship in 1978. Hilokoski also plays golf. He has scored three hole-in-ones.

Hilokoski has participated in the Ballmaster Open tournament since the beginning in 1971, although he has missed a few. He won the tournament in 1977. He has got the maximum score of 300 points three times in ten-pin bowling.

He lives the winters in Málaga, where he arranges golf tours. His sister was also a bowler Lea Hilokoski (died 2007), who was on the best women bowlers.

Achievements
World champion in team bowling 1975
European champion in team bowling 1973
Personal Finnish championship 1978
Bowler of the decade 1970s

References

Finnish ten-pin bowling players
1941 births
Living people
Sportspeople from Helsinki